Sven Eugen Thuresson (5 November 1900 – 9 February 1982) was a Swedish long-distance runner. He competed in the men's 10,000 metres at the 1924 Summer Olympics.

References

External links
 

1900 births
1982 deaths
Athletes (track and field) at the 1924 Summer Olympics
Swedish male long-distance runners
Olympic athletes of Sweden
Place of birth missing
Olympic cross country runners